Gene Cantamessa (February 17, 1931 – November 8, 2011) was an American sound engineer. He won an Academy Award for Best Sound for his work on the 1982 Steven Spielberg film, E.T. the Extra-Terrestrial. Cantamessa received six additional Academy Award nominations in the same category during his career.

Selected filmography
Cantamessa won an Academy Award and was nominated for six more:

Won
 E.T. the Extra-Terrestrial (1982)

Nominated
 The Candidate (1972)
 Young Frankenstein (1974)
 Close Encounters of the Third Kind (1977)
 1941 (1979)
 2010: The Year We Make Contact (1984)
 Star Trek IV: The Voyage Home (1986)

References

External links

1931 births
2011 deaths
American audio engineers
Musicians from New York City
Best Sound Mixing Academy Award winners
Engineers from New York City